3YOURMIND is a Berlin-based 3D printing software company, founded by Aleksander Ciszek and Stephan Kuehr. The company was launched in 2014.

Overview 
The company is a spin-off of the Technical University of Berlin. The online e-commerce and Enterprise platforms of the company were launched in 2015. The company provides integrations to 3D printing directly from 15 CAD software programs. 3YOURMIND developed the AM Part Identifier(AMPI) system with advising from Electro-Optical Systems (EOS) to evaluate a company's entire part inventory and identifies the parts that are suitable for 3D printing.

Activities 
The company was a founding partner of  the Additive Manufacturing Forum event in Berlin in 2017.

Achievements 
3YOURMIND received the German Innovation Award in 2016, which made them the member of the German Accelerator Program in Silicon Valley.

The company won first prize in FormNext 2016 which was powered by TCT Startup Challenge.

Funding 
The company raised its seed investment round in 2015, led by AM Ventures.

The company raised $12 million in the Series A investment round in 2017.

See also 
 3D Printing Process

References 

3D printer companies
3D printing
Companies based in Berlin
Technology companies established in 2014